Ten Tall Men is a 1951 American adventure film starring Burt Lancaster about the French Foreign Legion during the Rif War in Morocco. Though co-written and directed by Willis Goldbeck, Goldbeck walked off the film due to disputes with Lancaster (whose own company, Norma Productions, produced the film) with the movie being completed by Robert Parrish.  Credited as an associate producer, Robert Aldrich was a production manager on the film where he met Lancaster, which led him to direct Vera Cruz for him. Robert Clary made his debut in the film as an Arab batman. Portions of the film were filmed in Palm Springs, California. The story was released as a Fawcett Movie Comic #16 in April 1951.

Plot
After capturing an important Rif prisoner in an undercover operation, Sergeant Mike Kincaid (Lancaster) is imprisoned himself for striking a lieutenant (Stephen Bekassy) who beats a French woman (Mari Blanchard) with his riding crop for preferring Kincaid to him. Kincaid has a longstanding rivalry with the lieutenant, but the lieutenant is now in command of the company holding the city of Tarfa while the regiment is away. As the ranking officer, the lieutenant uses Kincaid's striking of him to get his revenge.

Kincaid is imprisoned alongside seven military prisoners and the captured Rif who has refused to talk, with the lieutenant refusing food and water to both Kincaid and the Rif.  When his two comrades-in-arms who accompanied him on the mission, Corporals Luis Delgado (Gilbert Roland) and Pierre Molier (Kieron Moore), sneak food and water to Kincaid, he shares them with the Rif.  To repay Kincaid's kindness and assuage his own guilt for telling the lieutenant about Kincaid's assignation with the Frenchwoman, the tells of an impending attack on Tarfa while the garrison is weak. The Rif believes Kincaid will escape to save himself, but he instead warns the lieutenant.

The experienced Kincaid tells the lieutenant that their only chance is to release him to lead a series of guerrilla hit-and-run attacks to delay the enemy for five days until the regiment returns.  The lieutenant agrees, but only if Kincaid will testify that the idea was his. Kincaid agrees to his terms. The only men available for the mission are the seven prisoners, who receive full pardons for their crimes.  His two corporals join them, raising their number to ten.

When scouting an enemy camp, the Legionnaires discover two rival tribes have joined forces, making them strong enough to take the city. Using his expertise in disguise and language, Kincaid finds out that the Rif leader, Khalid Hussein (Gerald Mohr), is marrying Mahla (Jody Lawrance) in order to cement an alliance with the other tribe. Kincaid kidnaps her to force the enemy to chase him for the five days.

Mahla begins to fall in love with her handsome captor, as Hussein pursues the Legionnaires across the desert. In the midst of the dangers, the patrol finds a destroyed Legion truck containing a safe that one of the men opens, revealing a large Legion payroll. When Jardine (John Dehner) tries to get away with the payroll, he is shot, but that tells the Rifs where they are.

Kincaid is eventually captured and Mahla freed. She demands that Kincaid be released unharmed, or she will not marry Hussein. Hussein reluctantly does so. Kincaid and his men infiltrate the wedding ceremony, and fighting breaks out. Mahla's tribe switches sides, and Hussein is killed.

Cast

Production
The film was the first of a two-picture deal Columbia Pictures signed with Norma Productions, the company of Burt Lancaster and Harold Hecht. (The second was to be Small Wonder, a film in which Lancaster would not appear.)

It was originally a Western story by James Warner Bellah and Willis Goldbeck which concerned conflict between the US cavalry and Apaches. Producer Harold Hecht and star Burt Lancaster then decided that "John Ford and other Hollywood operators have so effectively decimated the Apache population" that they hired writer A.I. Bezzerides to reimagine the story with a Foreign Legion setting which wound up involving the Rif War (1911-1927). Roland Kibbee and Frank Davis were hired to rewrite the script to make it more comedic.

The film was shot in February 1950 at the Columbia Ranch in the San Fernando Valley and on location in Yuma, Arizona.

Notes

External links
 
 

1950s adventure comedy films
1951 comedy films
1951 films
American adventure comedy films
Columbia Pictures films
Films adapted into comics
Films directed by Willis Goldbeck
Films scored by David Buttolph
Films set in deserts
Films set in Morocco
Films shot in California
Films produced by Burt Lancaster
Films produced by Harold Hecht
Films about the French Foreign Legion
Norma Productions films
1950s English-language films
1950s American films